Oskaloosa may refer to a place in the United States:

Oskaloosa, Iowa
Oskaloosa, Kansas
Oskaloosa, Missouri